Cardell Camper (July 6, 1952 – December 7, 2010) was a professional baseball pitcher.

Career
Camper played seven seasons in the minors, in the St. Louis Cardinals, Cleveland Indians and Philadelphia Phillies organizations; when the Indians expanded their roster in September 1977, Camper was brought up. He appeared in three games: pitching two scoreless innings September 11 (in Baltimore) and again on September 17 (at home against Toronto), before starting in Toronto October 2. The Blue Jays touched him for four runs on seven hits in six innings, but Camper got the win as the Tribe triumphed, 5–4. It was his last major league appearance.

That winter, Camper was traded to the Phillies for eccentric outfielder Joe Charboneau, who became the American League Rookie of the Year in 1980 before injuries ended his career. Camper's baseball career ended in 1979; he died in 2010.

External links

Baseball Gauge
Mexican League
Venezuelan League

1952 births
2010 deaths
African-American baseball players
American expatriate baseball players in Mexico
Arkansas Travelers players
Baseball players from Oklahoma
Cleveland Indians players
Glendale Gauchos baseball players
Dorados de Chihuahua players
Gulf Coast Red Birds players
Leones del Caracas players
Major League Baseball pitchers
Mexican League baseball pitchers
Navegantes del Magallanes players
American expatriate baseball players in Venezuela
Oklahoma City 89ers players
People from Boley, Oklahoma
Portland Beavers players
Reading Phillies players
St. Petersburg Cardinals players
Saraperos de Saltillo players
Sultanes de Monterrey players
Toledo Mud Hens players
20th-century African-American sportspeople
21st-century African-American people